RI:SE is a breakfast television show made by Princess Productions in collaboration with BSkyB for Channel 4 in the United Kingdom. It was scheduled to replace The Big Breakfast after declining ratings. It launched on 29 April 2002. The programme was broadcast between 06:55 and 09:00 in the morning - nationally in the UK. It ended on 19 December 2003.

History
Original presenters included Mark Durden-Smith, Colin Murray, Kirsty Gallacher, Edith Bowman, Tom Binns, Chris Rogers, Liz Bonnin and Henry Bonsu.

Its viewing figures did not meet the initial expectations, and a variety of format changes were made to try to boost ratings. The programme began to model itself after The Big Breakfast, with the presenters sitting as a couple in front of French windows, games, competitions, crew involvement and outside broadcasts with the likes of Mel Giedroyc and Sue Perkins drafted in.  This was despite ratings increasing during its coverage of Big Brother 3 where over 500,000 tuned in.

The show launched on the 29th April 2002 and in its first run underwent many presenting changes and producer departures as there was little interest in the show. Many criticised the show for its lack of titles, over reliance on a news ticker and six pack of news and unfunny features like search for a nobody, strap me down and lip service. The show was trounced in the ratings by GMTV. Sebastian Scott the executive producer who was present in the launch said that the expectation was for viewers to not watch it at length but to watch it in small increments.
 
Various presenter changes occurred where it was announced that Mark Durden Smith, Colin Murray, Liz Bonnin, Chris Rogers and Kirsty Gallagher would leave. 

This happened in various stages throughout the latter part of 2002. The final episode of the year saw a reworking of Shakin Stevens Merry Christmas Everyone with Girls Aloud and Popstars The Rivals competitors and celebrities singing on the video. The famous blinking clock effect accompanied by a snowflake and a Christmas theme.

The show’s music changed on October 1st with the clock changing from white to yellow and the music soundtrack sounding more enlivened and more uplifting.

Relaunch
The show was relaunched on 20 January 2003 with presenters Iain Lee and Edith Bowman.  Mel and Sue took over the final half-hour from 8:30. Bowman was later replaced by 2002 Big Brother winner, Kate Lawler. Zora Suleman provided half-hourly news updates. Dougie Anderson was a stand-in presenter and also often reported from a record shop near the studio) as well as helping with the daily television review.

During the Iraq war the show was shortened to allow for Channel 4 News coverage to be shown. In the Summer of 2003 Mel and Sue left RI:SE and the show was solely presented by Iain, Kate and Dougie.

RI:SE gave extensive coverage to reality TV formats including Big Brother, Pop Idol and The Salon. In summer 2003, RI:SE launched a contest for a member of the public to become the "reality correspondent", a competition won by "Kitty", who remained with the show until the final episode.

Big Brother monitor "James" joined Iain Lee and Kate Lawler, after winning a competition to become so  giving updates on events in the house and conducting live interviews with the latest evictees. One episode featured PJ who joined Iain and Kate after the first housemate - Anouska - was evicted from the Big Brother 4 house. James also accompanied Kitty on the final show.

Production
Originally broadcast from Sky's campus in Isleworth, RI:SE moved to Whiteley's Shopping Centre in Bayswater, west London as part of the January 2003 relaunch - the more central location was intended to make it easier to book guests.

Controversy
The Independent Television Commission condemned the show for an episode aired in December 2002 in which satirical jokes were made about Jesus Christ.

Cancellation
The last episode was shown on 19 December 2003, and had the most popular guests from the previous months including Jon Tickle and Shaun Dooley. The show ended with a giant 'pile on' which had been organised by Iain and Kate during the weeks before the last episode. Despite a small fan base and a loyal number of viewers tuning in, Channel 4 did not feel it was viable to continue. In its run the show featured the entertainment report, Textocution where viewers could vote off a person they hated with the remaining participant winning a holiday. This was along with the paper review and text to win where a true or false question was posed.

Since then, the show's morning slot has been taken up by reruns of sitcoms such as Friends, Everybody Loves Raymond and Frasier. In January 2006, Channel 4 launched a new live show since RI:SE, called Morning Glory, which was presented by Dermot O'Leary. It broadcast between 08:30 and 09:00, Monday to Friday morning for a three-week spell during Channel 4's 2006 run of Celebrity Big Brother 4, but was not renewed due to poor viewing figures. From 2006, Freshly Squeezed, a music show was broadcast between 07:00 and 07:30 in the morning.

The Bayswater studio - owned by Princess Productions - was later used to broadcast The Wright Stuff on Channel 5.

In a December 2019 Twitch broadcast, former presenter Iain Lee noted that on one occasion the show recorded 0 viewers.

References

External links
BBC Online: New breakfast show Rises - coverage of the launch.
Off the Telly Review, April 2002 launch.
Off the Telly Review, December 2002.
Off the Telly Review, January 2003 relaunch.

Channel 4 original programming
2002 British television series debuts
2003 British television series endings
English-language television shows
Breakfast television in the United Kingdom